Acidovorax anthurii is a Gram-negative bacterium which causes plant diseases. This species belongs to Comamonadaceae.

References

External links
Type strain of Acidovorax anthurii at BacDive -  the Bacterial Diversity Metadatabase

Comamonadaceae
Bacteria described in 2000